Chang Jeng-shyuang (born 30 January 1974) is a Taiwanese badminton player. He competed in the men's singles tournament at the 1996 Summer Olympics.

References

External links
 

1974 births
Living people
Taiwanese male badminton players
Olympic badminton players of Taiwan
Badminton players at the 1996 Summer Olympics
Place of birth missing (living people)